Seonggyungwan was the foremost educational institution in Seoul, Joseon Dynasty.

Seonggyungwan may also refer to:
Songgyungwan, the foremost educational institution in Kaesong, Goryeo and Joseon Dynasties
Koryo Songgyungwan University, an educational institution in Kaesong, North Korea
Sungkyunkwan University, an educational institution in Seoul and Suwon, South Korea
Sungkyunkwan University Station, metro station in Seoul, South Korea